Decathlon SE is a French sporting goods retailer. With over 2080 stores in 56 countries and regions (2023), it is the largest sporting goods retailer in the world.

The company manages the research, design, production, logistics and distribution of its products in-house; partners with global suppliers; and markets its own brands directly to consumers in Decathlon-branded big-box stores.

History
Founded by Michel Leclercq in 1976, Decathlon started with a store in Lille, France. Its holding company was formerly known as Oxylane.

The company expanded abroad a decade later: to Germany in 1986, Spain in 1992, Italy in 1993, Belgium in 1997, Portugal, the United Kingdom in 1999, Brazil in 2001, mainland China in 2003, India in 2009, Turkey and Czech Republic in 2010, Taiwan in 2012, Hong Kong in 2013, Malaysia and Singapore in 2016, South Africa, Philippines and Indonesia in 2017 in South Korea and  Australia in 2018, and Canada in 2019. The company employs more than 87,000 staff from 80 different nationalities.

The retailer stocks a wide range of sporting goods, from tennis rackets to advanced scuba diving equipment, usually in large, big-box superstores  averaging 4,000m2 in size. Decathlon Group markets its products under more than 20 brands. Its research and development facilities are located across France, where the company develops its product designs, registering up to 40 patents per year.

In January 2022, Decathlon named Ingka group's chief digital officer, Barbara Martin Coppola, as its new global chief executive officer.

Product brands
Decathlon is vertically integrated, designing and developing its own products and marketing under its more than 20 brands, with each sport—and often sub-sports and sports groups—having their own:

Allsix - Volleyball (indoor)
Aptonia - Nutrition and Triathlon
Artengo - Tennis
Atorka - Handball
B'Twin - Cycling
Caperlan - Fishing
Domyos - Fitness, Gym and Dance
Forclaz - Trekking
Fouganza - Horse Riding
FLX - Cricket
Geologic - Target Sports such as Archery, Darts
Geonaute - Sports Electronics
Inesis - Golf
Inovik - Cross-country skiing
Itiwit - Paddle sports
Kalenji - Running
Kimjaly - Yoga
Kipsta - Team Sports
KOODZA - Pétanque
KOROK - Field hockey
Kuikma - Padel
Nabaiji - Swimming
Newfeel - Sport Walking
Offload - Rugby
Olaian - Surfing and Boardwalking
Opfeel - Squash
Orao - Kiting and Kitesurfing
Oroks - Ice hockey
Outshock - Combat Sports
Oxelo - Rollersports, Skating and Scooters
Perfly - Badminton
Quechua - Hiking and Camping
Rockrider - Mountain Biking
Sandever - Beach Tennis
Simond - Mountaineering
Solognac - Hunting
Subea - Diving
Tarmak - Basketball
Triban - Cycling (Comfort-Oriented)
Tribord - Sailing
Urball - Pelota and One-wall handball/Wallball
Van Rysel - Cycling (Performance/Racing-Oriented)
Wed'Ze - Skiing and Snowboarding

Brands providing technical support for the products for the company's passion brands:
Equarea - Clothing designed for the active removal of sweat
Essensole - Shoe soles and insoles
Novadry - Waterproof and breathable clothes
Stratermic - Warm and light clothes
Strenfit - Light and Robust Synthetic fabrics (non garment)
Supportiv - Support and compression

Sponsorship

Association football (Kipsta)

Clubs 

  K.V. Oostende
  R. Charleroi S.C. (2023-24 season onwards)
  R.E. Virton
  RAAL La Louvière
  RAEC Mons
  Sporting Hasselt
  AS Nancy-Lorraine
  Nîmes Olympique

Former clubs 

  Lille
  Valenciennes
  Tampines Rovers

Associations and leagues 
Kipsta is the official match ball supplier for the following associations and leagues:

 Pro League (2023-24 season onwards)
Belgian Pro League
Challenger Pro League
Belgian Cup
Belgian Super Cup
  Ligue de Football Professionnel
Ligue 1
Ligue 2
  Ghana Women's Premier League

Cycling (Van Rysel) 

 Cofidis (Kit supplier)

Squash (Opfeel) 

  Mélissa Alves
  Antoine Camille Petrucci
  Camille Serme
  Robert Downer

Tennis (Artengo)

Players 

  Gaël Monfils
  Daria Kasatkina

Events 

  Moselle Open

Other notable sponsorships 
In October 2020, Decathlon Ghana was announced as the Ghana Football Association's official sports retail partner for all Ghana national football team paraphernalia and other merchandising products in a GH₵1 million (≈ €146,000) four-year partnership deal.

In January 2021, Decathlon signed a multi-year merchandising agreement with the National Basketball Association as an official licensee under Tarmak.

Decathlon Germany will be the main sponsor of the IBU World Cup Biathlon as of the 2021/2022 season.

Decathlon India became the sports partner of Kolkata Thunderbolts for the 2022 season of the Prime Volleyball League.

Decathlon bought a five-year naming rights for Lille's Stade Pierre-Mauroy for €6 million from 2022 onwards, renaming the stadium as Decathlon Arena Stade Pierre-Mauroy.

Decathlon became an official partner of the Paris 2024 Olympic and Paralympic Games.

Locations

As of May 2021, Decathlon operated 1,655 Decathlon stores worldwide in nearly 1,000 cities and 65 countries.

Online delivery has been introduced in Australia, Bangladesh, Belgium, Brazil, Bulgaria, Czech Republic, Chile, Colombia, Estonia, France, Germany, Greece, Hong Kong SAR, Hungary, India, Indonesia, Ireland, Israel, Italy, Japan, Mainland China, Mexico, Netherlands, Poland, Portugal, Philippines, Romania, Singapore, Spain, Taiwan, Turkey, Ukraine, United Kingdom, and recently, Egypt, Malaysia, Thailand, Vietnam, and parts of Canada (Ontario & Quebec).

In India, Decathlon products may be purchased directly through their stores, after a change in India's FDI policy and approval for Decathlon in February 2013. In addition to this, Decathlon products are also available online through their online resellers.

In late 2016, an online-only delivery service was introduced in Tunisia in preparation for the opening in Tunis of its first store.
The first store opened in November 2017 in Tunis City commercial center in Tunis. A second location opened in April 2018 in the country situated in La Marsa.

In February 2017, they opened the first store in Bogota, Colombia in the mall Parque La Colina.

In July 2017, Decathlon entered the Philippine market with a location at Festival Mall in Filinvest Corporate City, Alabang, Muntinlupa, and in Tiendesitas, Pasig.
In August 2017, the company announced it would open its first Canadian store in Brossard, Quebec during the spring of 2018.

In November 2017, Decathlon entered the Indonesia market.

Their first Australian store opened in Tempe, Sydney, NSW, in December 2017. After two years in the Australian market, the viability of the Australian business is under question after posting a trading loss of $19,563,819 (Australian dollars) in two years of trading.

In April 2018, the company announced it would open its first store in Kyiv, Ukraine, in the first months of 2019.

In 2019, the company opened stores in Ireland; Vietnam; Bangladesh; Malta; and Serbia.  The company also opened stores in the United States (California). In an earlier attempt to enter the US market, it acquired the 18 Boston, Massachusetts area locations of MVP Sports Stores in 1999, rebranded them under the Decathlon brand, and subsequently closed those stores by 2006.

In November 2020, the first Decathlon store opened in Riga, Latvia.

Decathlon was supposed to open in Mauritius in April 2021 but due to the lockdown, the grand opening was on 13 May 2021.

In April 2021, the first Decathlon store opened in Saudi Arabia, Jeddah.

Following the 2022 Russian invasion of Ukraine, many international, particularly Western companies, pulled out of Russia. Decathlon has been criticized for not announcing any scaling down of its operations, unlike most of its Western competitors. On 29 March, Decathlon announced that it has ceased its operations and suspended the operation of all its stores in Russia. However, reports in mid-June indicated that the stores are still in operation and may be temporally closed by the end of the month until it becomes possible to renew supplies.

Economic review
Its success has greatly contributed to the decline of independent retailers in France, while the spread of its own brands has caused great difficulties for traditional manufacturers. 2008 was a record year for the company as the brand Decathlon had beaten all its competitors on three key points: margin, market share, and highest turnover per square meter of retail space. It is arguably the third at a global level. A 2008 survey of 774 catchment areas at the request of the Ministry of Economy and Finance shows that "for sporting goods, Decathlon is dominant in 92.8% of zones". This dominant position has the effect of marginalizing its commercial competitors, including independent retailers.

Competition
Otherwise, the company does not have significant competition due to its specific target audience in mass-market retail. Intersport is also a major competitor mainly in the European market.
Decathlon has changed its name to Nolhtaced for a month in Belgium for promoting reverse shopping.

Social standards
Decathlon claims to follow a strict policy when it comes to employee welfare and that all contractors working with Decathlon follow the Human Responsibility in Production (HRP) process in all activities. The HRP designates the management system and resources implemented by Decathlon relative to workplace conditions at production sites and with suppliers. 

Since 2003, Decathlon has adopted a social charter of the Social and Environmental Responsibility World Forum regarding human rights, health and safety, respect for the environment, corruption and management and communication.

Decathlon has, however, declined to disclose the names of its suppliers, and has been under scrutiny after reports indicate that the company's suppliers in Sri Lanka's free trade zones violate the country's labor laws.

References

External links

 
Clothing companies of France
Dancewear companies
Sporting goods retailers
Retail companies of France
Multinational companies headquartered in France
Villeneuve-d'Ascq
Clothing companies established in 1976
Retail companies established in 1976
Companies based in Hauts-de-France
French companies established in 1976
Cycle manufacturers of France
Mountain bike manufacturers
Sporting goods manufacturers of France